WLKI (100.3 FM) is an American FM radio station licensed to and based in Angola, Indiana, and serving portions of northeastern Indiana, northwestern Ohio, and south-central Michigan. Owned by Coldwater, Michigan businessman Stephen Swick, the station airs a hybrid adult contemporary/Hot AC music format branded as FM's Best.

The station began broadcasting on November 7, 1969 at 100.1 MHz, and became WLKI on July 15, 1974. WLKI was owned by Thomas R. Andrews owner of Lake Cities Broadcasting Corporation until April 2008, when it was sold to Stephen Swick (under the corporate name Swick Broadcasting Corporation) for $3.8 million along with sister stations WTHD in LaGrange, Indiana and WLZZ in Montpelier, Ohio (both country-formatted), and sports WBET/oldies WBET-FM in Sturgis, Michigan.

WLKI's primary service area includes the cities of Angola, Fremont, Clear Lake, Orland, and Waterloo in Indiana, Coldwater, Bronson and Camden in Michigan, and Edon, Ohio. Its signal reaches portions of DeKalb County, and can be heard as far away as Hudson, Michigan although reception farther east is impeded by co-channel WNIC in the Detroit area.

The WLKI airstaff includes Andy St. John in the mornings and afternoons, mid-days with Jeremy Robinson and nights with Randi Douglas.

HD Radio
In November, 2009, WLKI began broadcasting in HD, allowing Swick the opportunity to place two additional signals into the Angola area.  The former 92.5 translator (W223AM) in Bronson, Michigan, and 99.5 translator (W258AO) in Hillsdale, Michigan, were both purchased by Swick, and moved to the WLKI tower site, with the former becoming 92.7 (W224BY Angola, Indiana), and the latter becoming 101.3 (W267BE Angola, Indiana).  92.7 is now rebroadcasting WLKI-HD3's Christmas music format.  On December 31, 2009, 101.3 became the home of "U-Rock 101.3", which is also broadcast on WLKI-HD2.

On November 1, 2021, WLKI-HD3 dropped its "Fox Sports Angola" sports format and began stunting with Christmas music as "92.7 The Christmas Station'. On December 26, 2021, WLKI-HD3 flipped to Hot-AC as "Hot FM 92.7", with the first song being "You Need to Calm Down" by Taylor Swift"

References

External links
Swick Broadcasting Stations
WLKI website (streaming audio available)
92.7 The Christmas Station website

LKI
Mainstream adult contemporary radio stations in the United States
Steuben County, Indiana
Radio stations established in 1969
Radio stations established in 1974
1969 establishments in Indiana